The Valiant Years was a documentary produced by ABC based on the memoirs of Winston Churchill, directed by Anthony Bushell and John Schlesinger, narrated by Gary Merrill and with extracts from the memoirs voiced by Richard Burton. It ran in the United States from 1960 to 1961, in 27 30-minute episodes and was broadcast in the UK by the BBC from February to August 1961. Its incidental music was written by Richard Rodgers, who won an Emmy for it in 1962. Scriptwriters included Victor Wolfson a dramatist and writer, playwright William Templeton, Quentin Reynolds, William L. Shirer, an American journalist, war correspondent and historian, and Richard Tregaskis. One of the programme's London-based producers was actor Patrick Macnee, just prior to his being cast as secret agent John Steed in the long-running cult TV series The Avengers.

Awards
 Richard Rodgers won an Emmy award in 1962 for the music he wrote for the programme.
 Victor Wolfson, who wrote several episodes, won an Emmy Award 1960-1961 for Outstanding Writing Achievement in the Documentary Field.

List of episodes

 The Gathering Storm
 Combat Deepens
 Dunkirk
 French Agony
 Take One with You
 The Ravens Remain
 Struggle at Sea
 Hinge of Fate
 Alone no More
 Out of the East
 The Torch is Lit
 Sand and Snow
 Strike Hard, Strike Home!
 Closing the Ring
 Be Sure you Win
 Turning of the Tide
 The Die is Cast
 D-Day
 Europe Set Ablaze
 Triumph in France
 Beginning of the End
 Final Christmas
 Yalta
 Tying the Knot
 Götterdämmerung
 Goodbye, Mr Churchill
 The Will to Victory

References

External links
 

Films about Winston Churchill